Kim Jong-chul (born 25 September 1981), sometimes spelled Kim Jong Chol, is a son of former North Korean Supreme Leader Kim Jong-il. His younger brother is current Supreme Leader Kim Jong-un. His older half-brother Kim Jong-nam was assassinated in February 2017.

In 2007, Jong-chul was appointed deputy chief of a leadership division of the Workers' Party of Korea. However, on 15 January 2009, the South Korean Yonhap News Agency reported that Kim Jong-il appointed his youngest son, Jong-un, to be his successor, passing over Jong-nam and Jong-chul. These reports were supported in April 2009 when Kim Jong-un assumed a low-level position within the ruling Workers' Party since Kim Jong-il was groomed by his own father, Kim Il-sung, in a similar way before becoming North Korean leader in 1994.

Early life
Kim Jong-chul was born in 1981.  He is the son of Kim Jong-il and companion Ko Yong-hui, who died in 2004. He was educated at the International School of Berne with younger brother Kim Jong Un.
Until 2001, it was assumed that Kim Jong-il's eventual heir would be his eldest son, Kim Jong-nam, whose mother was Song Hye-rim. But in May 2001, Kim Jong-nam was arrested at Narita International Airport, Japan, travelling on a forged Dominican Republic passport. He was held and then deported to the People's Republic of China. The incident caused Kim Jong-il to cancel a planned visit to China because of the embarrassment to both countries.  As a result of this incident, Kim Jong-nam fell from favour, although Kim himself said his loss of favour had been due to advocating reform.

Heir apparent
In February 2003, moves began to raise the profile of Kim Jong-chul. The Korean People's Army began a propaganda campaign using the slogan "The Respected Mother is the Most Faithful and Loyal Subject to the Dear Leader Comrade Supreme Commander". Since the "Respected Mother" was described as "[devoting] herself to the personal safety of the comrade supreme commander", and "[assisting] the comrade supreme commander nearest to his body", Western analysts assume that the "Respected Mother" was Ko Yong-hui, mother of Kim Jong-chul and Kim Jong-un. A similar campaign was launched in praise of Kim Jong-il's mother (Kim Jong-suk) during the later years of Kim Il-sung's life. This suggested that Kim Jong-chul, despite his youth, had emerged with Army backing to be a serious contender to succeed his father.

However, Kenji Fujimoto, Kim Jong-il's personal sushi chef, wrote in his memoir, I Was Kim Jong-il's Cook, that Kim Jong-il thought Jong-chul was "no good because he is like a little girl". Fujimoto believed Kim Jong-il favoured his youngest son, Kim Jong-un.

On 1 June 2009, it was reported that Kim Jong-chul had been passed over as his younger brother, Kim Jong-un, was to succeed his father as the head of the Workers' Party of Korea and de facto head of state of North Korea.

2011–present
Kim Jong-chul was reportedly spotted in Singapore on 14 February 2011, where he was attending an Eric Clapton concert. In late 2011, his father died and his younger brother, Kim Jong-un, succeeded his father as the head of state. He was again apparently spotted attending two additional Clapton concerts on successive days at the Royal Albert Hall in London, in May 2015.

According to Lee Yun-keol (as reported by Wen Wei Po), chairman of the North Korea Strategy Information Service Center, Kim Jong-chul personally led the arrest of his uncle Jang Song-thaek. Some analysts believe that this signals an expanded role for Kim Jong-chul in the North Korean regime.

Kim Jong-chul does not involve himself in politics, leading a quiet life in Pyongyang where he plays guitar in a band, according to Thae Yong-ho, North Korea's former deputy ambassador in London who defected to the South.

References

Further reading 
 Bradley Martin, Under The Loving Care of the Fatherly Leader: North Korea and the Kim Dynasty, St. Martins (2004), hardcover, 868 pages, 
 Kenji Fujimoto. I Was Kim Jong Il's Cook.

1981 births
Living people
Children of national leaders
Kim dynasty (North Korea)
North Korean expatriates in Macau
Alternate members of the 8th Central Committee of the Workers' Party of Korea